Propebela exquisita is a species of sea snail, a marine gastropod mollusk in the family Mangeliidae.

Description
The length of the shell varies between 8 mm and 20 mm.

Distribution
This species occurs in the Sea of Japan.

References

 P Bartsch. "The Nomenclatorial Status of Certain Northern Turritid Mollusks"; Proceedings of the biological Society of Washington 54, 1-14, 1941
 Higo, Shun'ichi, Paul Callomon, and Yoshihiro Gotō. Catalogue and bibliography of the marine shell bearing mollusca of Japan: Gastropoda, Bivalvia, Polyplacophora, Scaphopoda. Elle Scientific, 1999.
 Hasegawa K. (2009) Upper bathyal gastropods of the Pacific coast of northern Honshu, Japan, chiefly collected by R/V Wakataka-maru. In: T. Fujita (ed.), Deep-sea fauna and pollutants off Pacific coast of northern Japan. National Museum of Nature and Science Monographs 39: 225–383.

External links
 

exquisita
Gastropods described in 1941